R (on the application of Bancoult (No 2)) v Secretary of State for Foreign and Commonwealth Affairs [2016] UKSC 35 was a 2016 judgment of the Supreme Court of the United Kingdom that affirmed the decision of the House of Lords in R v Secretary of State for Foreign and Commonwealth Affairs, ex parte Bancoult (No 2) despite new evidence subsequently coming to light. 
The case dismissed an attempt to set aside R (Bancoult) v Secretary of State for Foreign and Commonwealth Affairs (No 2) [2008] UKHL 61 on the grounds that the British government had failed to disclose a feasibility study relating to the Chagos Islands.

See also
Chagos Archipelago
Louis Olivier Bancoult

References

External links
Supreme Court judgment
Video of the judgment

Chagos Archipelago sovereignty dispute
Supreme Court of the United Kingdom cases
2016 in British law
2016 in case law